Dafne is the earliest known work that, by modern standards, could be considered an opera.  The libretto by Ottavio Rinuccini survives complete; the mostly lost music was completed by Jacopo Peri, but at least two of the six surviving fragments are by Jacopo Corsi. Dafne was first performed during Carnival of 1598 (1597 old style) at the Palazzo Corsi.

History
Dafne is scored for a much smaller ensemble than Claudio Monteverdi's slightly later operas, namely, a harpsichord, a lute, a viol, an archlute, and a triple flute. Drawing on a new development at the time, Peri established recitatives, melodic speech set to music, as a central part of opera.

The story of Apollo falling in love with the eponymous nymph, Daphne, the opera was written for an elite circle of humanists in Florence, the Florentine Camerata, between 1594 and 1597, with the support, and possibly the collaboration, of the composer and patron Jacopo Corsi. An attempt to revive Greek drama, according to modern scholarship, it was a long way off from what the ancient Greeks would have recognized.

Most of Peri's music has been lost, despite its popularity and fame in Europe at the time of its composition, but the 455 line verse libretto was published and survives. Florence's ruling Medici family was sufficiently taken with Dafne to allow Peri's next work, Euridice, to be performed as part of Marie de' Medici and Henry IV's wedding celebrations in 1600.

See also

 La Dafne (Gagliano), 1608
 Dafne (Opitz–Schütz), 1627

References

External links
Libretto with translation at HOASM
The Starry Messenger by Justin Fleming, a play about the first production of Dafne

Operas by Jacopo Peri
Pastoral operas
Italian-language operas
Operas
1597 operas
Operas based on Metamorphoses
European court festivities
Lost operas